Fiorella Ghiladrotti (25 June 1946 – 13 September 2005) was an Italian Democratic Party of the Left later Democrats of the Left politician and trade unionist who served two terms as a Member of the European Parliament (MEP) for the North-West Italy constituency from 1994 to 1999 and again between 1999 and 2004. She was the first female President of the Italian region of Lombardy from 1992 to 1994, was a regional councillor of the Regional Council of Lombardy from 1990 to 1992 and a member of the National Council for Economics and Labour late in her life. Ghiladrotti has a room in the Pirelli Tower; an award; an association and scholarship named after her.

Biography
On 25 June 1946, Ghilardotti was born in the small town of Castelverde close in Cremona, Lombardy, Italy. She was the daughter of a bricklayer and had one brother. Following graduation from the Università Cattolica del Sacro Cuore with a Economics and Commence degree, Ghilardotti worked as a cultural operator for the ENAIP doing 150-hour courses in Milan during the early 1970s. She worked as a trade unionist from 1975, firstly at the Italian Federation of Metal Mechanics and then as secretary-general of the CISL in Milan from 1981 to 1990. During her period as a trade unionist, Ghiladrotti not only dealt with metalworker and textile workers issues but also socio-health issues and training employees.

She was elected regional councillor of the Regional Council of Lombardy as an independent candidate of the Democratic Party of the Left (PDS) in 1990. Two years later, Ghiladrotti was elected President of the Italian region of Lombardy, becoming the first woman to be appointed to the position. This followed the arrest of 12 councillors as a result of the Mani pulite scandal reducing credibility. She led a centre-left council, which was a minority receiving support from the Christian Democracy and the Italian Socialist Party parties as well as radicals. Ghiladrotti was vice-president of the Committee of Regions between 1993 and 1994, and she remained President of Lombardy until 1994.

Standing for the Group of the Party of European Socialists (PES) at the 1994 European Parliament election in Italy, she was elected a Member of the European Parliament (MEP) for the North-West Italy constituency on 19 July 1994 with 57,391 preference votes. As an MEP, Ghiladrotti frequently participated in legislative activity such as social legislation affecting the lives of the weakest members of the public and lobbying for women's rights in society and work. She was a member of the Members from the European Parliament to the Joint Assembly of the Agreement between the African, Caribbean and Pacific States and the European Union, Committee on Budgets; Committee on Women's Rights and Delegation for relations with South Africa. Ghiladrotti was a substitute for each of the Committee on Social Affairs and Employment, Committee on Employment and Social Affairs and Delegation to the EU-Malta Joint Parliamentary Committee.

On 1 January 1999, she became a member of the Democrats of the Left, and was president of the PES Women's Commission between 1997 and 2004. Ghiladrotti was reelected to the European Parliament as a MEP for the North-West Italy constituency at the 1999 European Parliament election in Italy on 19 July 1999. She was a member of the Committee on Employment and Social Affairs; Committee on Women's Rights and Equal Opportunities; Members from the European Parliament to the Joint Parliamentary Assembly of the Agreement between the African, Caribbean and Pacific States and the European Union and Committee on Legal Affairs and the Internal Market. Ghiladrotti was a substitute for both the Committee on Employment and Social Affairs and Committee on Industry, External Trade, Research and Energy.

She presented a report on the "gender budget" to the European Parliament when public budgets were analysed in a non-neutral manner by noting the responsibility and role gaps between men and women for the first time in 2003. Ghiladrotti stood down as an MEP on 19 July 2004, and went back to politics in Italy and Milan, becoming a member of the National Council for Economics and Labour and head of labour problems as the PDS' Regional Secretariat. She was unavailable to stand for Mayor of Cremona in 2004 after her name was circulated for contention.

Personal life
Ghiladrotti was married to Sergio Graziosi, with whom she had two children. On the night of 13 September 2005, she died of a sudden illness in Milan. Ghiladrotti was given a funeral at the Santa Maria dell'Incoronata in Corso Garibaldi in Milan.

Legacy

The Ghiladrotti Fund issued by the S&D Equality and Diversity Traineeship was established by the Progressive Alliance of Socialists and Democrats in 2004 and is awarded "to enable young people to gain practical experience in the areas of social rights and employment, women’s rights, anti-discrimination, equal opportunities and fundamental rights and freedoms. The candidate of this fund must prove his/her personal commitment (NGOs), professional experience or studies in the fields mentioned above." The annual Fiore Award was first awarded in her name in early 2006, and a scholarship in Ghiladrotti's name was setup by the Fiorella Ghilardotti Association in December 2006 to "support the delicate transition from middle school to high school" in Italy.

In December 2009, the circle of the Democrats of the Left of Cassina de' Pecchi was named after her. A working room on the fifth floor of the Pirelli Tower in Milan was named in dedication after her in  a plaque unveiling ceremony held in December 2015.

References

1946 births
2005 deaths
Politicians from the Province of Cremona
20th-century Italian women politicians
21st-century Italian women politicians
20th-century women MEPs for Italy
21st-century women MEPs for Italy
MEPs for Italy 1994–1999
MEPs for Italy 1999–2004
Presidents of Lombardy
Democratic Party of the Left politicians
Democratic Party of the Left MEPs
Democrats of the Left politicians
Democrats of the Left MEPs
Università Cattolica del Sacro Cuore alumni
Italian women trade unionists